Gorsley is a small village in the Forest of Dean district of Gloucestershire, forming part of the civil parish of Gorsley and Kilcot in the South West England.  Nearby Gorsley Common and Little Gorsley are both in Herefordshire.

Location and amenities
The village is near junction 3 of the M50, one of the first motorways built in Britain in 1960. The slip roads on the junction end in right angled turns which often surprise motorists used to the more gradual, modern junction designs.

The Anglican church parish is combined with Cliffords Mesne. A stone Baptist chapel opened in 1852.

Gorsley limestone is named for the area. Stone from area quarries were used to build Victorian era buildings. Victorian maps show a number of quarries and lime kilns in the area.

The village pub is The Roadmaker, originally named The New Inn. It is owned and run by four ex-British Army Ghurka soldiers.

Gallery

References

External links

The Gorsley Village web site
BBC Hereford & Worcester - Gorsley Flower Festival photos
Gorsley Chapel

Villages in Gloucestershire
Forest of Dean